This article shows all participating team squads at the 2012 Men's European Water Polo Championship held at the Pieter van den Hoogenband Swim Stadium in Eindhoven, the Netherlands, from 16 to 29 January 2012.

Source

Source

Source

Source

Source

Source

Source

Source

Source

Source

Source

Source

References

Men
Men's European Water Polo Championship
European Water Polo Championship squads